Whitlow is a surname and given name.

Persons

Surname
 Jill Whitlow (born 1964), actress
 Mike Whitlow (born 1968), footballer
 Robert V. Whitlow (1918–1997), military officer
 Robert Whitlow, film-maker and author
 Woodrow Whitlow, Jr., associate administrator for Mission Support at NASA

Given name
 Whitlow Au, bioacoustician
 James Whitlow Delano (born 1960), photographer
 Whit Wyatt, (1907–1999), baseballer